The third season of the Romanian reality talent show Vocea României premiered on ProTV on September 28, 2013. Pavel Bartoș and Nicoleta Luciu returned as hosts, with Vlad Roșca as the social media correspondent. All four coaches returned for their third season. The show was moved from its usual Tuesday evening slot to Saturday evening.

This season brought rule changes. During the battle round, opposing coaches have the ability to steal the singer that was sent home by the original coach. If more than one coach hits their button to recruit the singer in question, it is up to the contestant to decide which coach he or she wants to work with. Each coach can save two contestants, which means the battle round will end with nine singers on each team, rather than seven. The sing-off further reduces each team to eight singers for the live shows, rather than six as in the previous season.

The season finale aired on December 26, 2013. Mihai Chițu, mentored by coach Horia Brenciu, was declared winner of the season. It was Brenciu's second consecutive victory as a coach.

Pre-selections 

Pre-selections took place in the following cities:

Teams 
Color key

Blind auditions 
The first phase of the competition, the blind auditions, taped August 5–8, 2013 at the MediaPro Studios, Buftea, began airing when the season premiered on September 28, 2013.
Color key

Episode 1 (September 28) 
The first of six pre-recorded audition episodes aired on Saturday, September 28, 2013. The season 2 finalists opened the show with a performance of "Don't Stop Believin'".

Episode 2 (October 5) 
The second episode was aired on October 5, 2013.

Episode 3 (October 12) 
The third episode was aired on October 12, 2013.

Episode 4 (October 19) 
The fourth episode was aired on October 19, 2013.

Episode 5 (October 26) 
The fifth episode was aired on October 26, 2013.

Episode 6 (November 2) 
The sixth and last blind audition episode aired on November 2, 2013.

The battles 
After the blind auditions, each coach had fourteen contestants for the battle rounds, taped October 10 and 11, 2013, at the MediaPro Studios, Buftea, and aired November 9–23, 2013. Coaches began narrowing down the playing field by training the contestants with the help of "trusted advisors". Each episode featured eight or ten battles consisting of pairings from within each team, and each battle concluding with the respective coach eliminating one of the two contestants.
"Steals" were introduced this season, where each coach could steal two contestants from another team when they lost their battle round. The names of the coaches who attempted to steal each losing contestant are ticked; the chosen coach is highlighted.
The trusted advisors for these episodes are:
 Monica Anghel (working with Horia Brenciu)
 Cornel Ilie (working with Loredana Groza)
 Șerban Cazan (working with Smiley)
 Randi (working with Marius Moga)
Color key

Episode 7 (9 November)
The seventh episode aired on November 9, 2013.

Episode 8 (16 November)
The eighth episode aired on November 16, 2013.

Episode 9 (16 November)
The ninth episode aired on November 23, 2013.

The Sing-off 
At the end of the battle rounds, each coach advanced seven contestants from their team to the live shows, leaving the other two to duel for the eighth and last spot, in an extra round called "the sing-off" (cântecul decisiv). The contestants sang their blind audition songs again and the coaches chose one contestant each.

Color key:

Live shows 
Color key

Live Playoffs (Week 1 & 2) 
Four contestants from each team competed in each of the first two live shows, which aired on Sunday, December 1 and Saturday, December 7, 2012, respectively. In either of the two shows, the public vote could save one contestant from each team, the second one being chosen by the coach. The other two contestants were eliminated.

Week 1 (December 1)

Week 2 (December 7)

Quarterfinals (Week 3) 
All 16 remaining contestants competed in the third live show on Saturday, December 14, 2013. Voting proceeded as before.

Semi-final (Week 4) 
All eight remaining contestants performed two songs each in the semi-final on Saturday, December 21, 2016. Within each team, the coach and the viewers each had a 50/50 say; the contestant with the highest combined score went on to the final.

Week 5: final (December 26) 
The top 4 contestants performed in the grand final on Thursday, December 26, 2013. This week, the four finalists performed a solo song, a duet with their coach and a duet with a famous singer. The public vote determined the winner, and that resulted in a victory for Mihai Chițu, Horia Brenciu's second consecutive victory as a coach.

* Band that consists of Felix Burdușa, Andrei Loică and Angelo Simonică, former Team Moga contestants.

Elimination chart 
Color key
Artist info

Result details

Overall

Controversies 
Giulio Vasilescu, a contestant in episode 2, claimed that his audition song (which he felt put him at a disadvantage) had been imposed upon him. None of the coaches pressed the "I WANT YOU" button.

The Vocea României production team was accused of nepotism in the case of contestant Muneer al-Obeidli by people who stated that Al-Obeidli had had a relationship with one of the producers, Roxana Paulică, and a long-lasting friendship with producer Mona Segall. Al-Obeidli was eliminated in the semi-final.

Contestant Romeo Zaharia, eliminated in episode 7 by Loredana after his duet with Aurel Niamțu, expressed his dissatisfaction with the coach's choice, claiming that the contest was staged and that Niamțu had been positively discriminated for the sake of diversity. Nico, a friend of Zaharia, has stated that he had threatened to jump off the building, in response to the result.

Niamțu, eliminated in episode 10 by his coach, Loredana Groza, claimed that Horia Brenciu, who had noted that all of his performances fell into a single musical genre, the romance, had unfairly and repeatedly criticized him as an excuse to solve a personal dispute with Groza. The contestant has also stated that he considered Brenciu an arrogant, valueless person, even having a live argument with him in the evening of his elimination. Other contestants claimed, on the contrary, that it was Niamțu who was arrogant and that his behavior was difficult to tolerate. In 2014, Niamțu accused ProTV, saying that they had intentionally rejected his son, Ionuț, who had signed up for the fourth season of the show.

Ratings

External links 
 Official Vocea României website

References 

2013 Romanian television seasons